Pyotr Ivanovich Shcherbakov (21 July 1929 – March 16, 1992) was a  Soviet film and theater actor. People's Artist of the RSFSR (1980). Member of the CPSU since 1955.

Biography 
Born July 21, 1929, in the village of Pozdnyakovo (now   Kaluga Oblast). After World War II, the family moved to Moscow.

In Theatre Institute Pyotr Shcherbakov was quite by accident. Since that year in GITIS was set only at the Directing Department, Pyotr took directly to the second year of the institute, which he graduated in 1955. At the same time he had while studying to pass exams in the subjects of the first course.

Pyotr served in the Theatre Group of Soviet Forces in Germany (1953-1956), Sovremennik Theatre (1958-1985), Moscow Art Theatre (1985-1991).

He made his debut in cinema in 1956. Actor glorified image  Slavka Ufimtsev  in the film by Yuri Yegorov Volunteers (1958).

Death
He died March 16, 1992. He was buried at the Vagankovo Cemetery.

Selected filmography 

 Stranitsy bylogo (1957) as Aleksey Koren
 Volunteers (1958) as Ufimtsev
 Pervyy den mira (1959) as Anatoliy Nefyodov
 Bitva v puti (1961) as Konstantin Grinin (uncredited)
 My vas lyubim (1962)
 Im pokoryaetsya nebo (1963) as Pilot Pyotr
 I Am Twenty (1965) as Chernousov
 Thirty Three (1965) as Viiktor Viktorovich
 Stroitsya most (1966) as Petukhov
 Idu iskat (1966) as Pavel Bakanov
 Vesna na Odere (1968) as Sizokrylov
 Chronicles of a Dive Bomber (1968) as Chief of Staff of the Regiment
 Liberation I: The Fire Bulge (1940) as General Telegin
 Liberation II: Breakthrough (1970) as General Telegin
 Deniskiny rasskazy (1970)
 Liberation III: Direction of the Main Blow (1970) as General Telegin
 Poezd v dalyokiy avgust (1971)
 Big School-Break (1972, TV Mini-Series) as guest
 The Days of the Turbins (1976, TV Movie) as Studzinsky
 Vy Petku ne videli? (1976)
 Vy mne pisali... (1977)
 Office Romance (1977) as Pyotr Ivanovich Bublikov
 Investigation Held by ZnaToKi: Till the third shot (1978, TV Series) as Bondar
 Na novom meste (1978) as Bit-Part
 Spodelena lyubov (1980) as Shadibin
 The Garage (1980) as Pyotr Petrovich
 Korpus generala Shubnikova (1980)
 Dialog s prodolzheniyem (1980) as Nikanor Alekseyevich
 The Old New Year (1981) as Poluorlov's friend, a bayan-player
 Tears Were Falling (1983) as Professor Sklyansky
 Pokhozhdeniya grafa Nevzorova (1983)
 We Are from Jazz (1983) as Ivan Ivanovich Bavurin
 Crazy Day of Engineer Barkasov (1983, TV Movie) as Abramotkin
 I zhizn, i slyozy, i lyubov... (1984) as Fedot Fedotovich
 Pokhishcheniye (1984)
 Nasledstvo (1984)
 Winter Evening in Gagra (1985) as Alexander Alexandrovich, administrator
 Mglistye berega (1986) as general Kutepov
 Valentin i Valentina (1986) as Professor
 Zaveshchanie (1986)
 Aeroport so sluzhebnogo vkhoda (1987)
 Razorvannyy krug (1987)
 Zerograd (1988) as head of city party council
 Zapretnaya zona (1988)
 Dorogoe udovolstvie (1988)
 Bez mundira (1988)
 Lyubov s privilegiyami (1989) as Mossovet vice-chairman
 Iz zhizni Fyodora Kuzkina (1989)
 Lyubov nemolodogo cheloveka (1990)
 Frenzied Bus (1990) as pilot
 Syshchik Peterburgskoy politsii (1991)
 Chyortov pyanitsa (1991)
 Odna na million (1992)
 Malenkiy gigant bolshogo seksa (1993) as Lawyer (final film role)

References

External links
 

1929 births
1992 deaths
Soviet male actors
Russian male actors
People from Kaluga Governorate
People's Artists of the RSFSR
Honored Artists of the RSFSR
Russian Academy of Theatre Arts alumni
Burials at Vagankovo Cemetery
Communist Party of the Soviet Union members